The Haliburton County Huskies are a Junior "A" ice hockey team from Haliburton, Ontario, Canada. They are a part of the Ontario Junior Hockey League.

History
This franchise was founded in 1965 as the Oshawa Crushmen, and were initially a member of the Eastern Junior B Hockey League. In 1972, the Crushmen jumped to the Metro Junior B Hockey League and were renamed the Legionaires.

In the late 1970s, the Legionaires were coached by future National Hockey League coach "Iron" Mike Keenan. Keenan's star player during this time was a young Dale Hawerchuk.

At the end of the 2005–06 season, the Oshawa Legionaires were bought out by NHLers Keith Primeau, Wayne Primeau, as well as business man Peter Tosh.  Keith had recently retired due to injury and created his own equipment line known as "Fury", based out of Oshawa. In turn, the Primeaus bought the local team and named them to reflect the name of his company.

In 2008, the Fury relocated to Whitby, Ontario, where they played out of the Iroquois Park Sports Centre.

In 2021, the Fury again relocated to Minden, Ontario in Haliburton County, where they play out of S.G Nesbitt Memorial Arena as the Haliburton County Huskies.

Staff
President: Paul Wilson
Director of Hockey Operations: Brad Townsend
General manager / Head Coach: Ryan Ramsay
Assistant general manager / Assistant Coach: Brain MacKenzie

Season-by-season results

Playoffs
MetJHL years
1990 – lost quarter-final
Oshawa Legionaires defeated Markham Connections 3 games to none
Wexford Raiders defeated Oshawa Legionaires 4 games to 3
1991 – lost semi-final
Oshawa Legionaires defeated Wellington Dukes 4 games to 2
Wexford Raiders defeated Oshawa Legionaires 4 games to 3
1992 – DNQ
1993 – DNQ
1994 – DNQ
1995 – DNQ
1996 – DNQ
1997 – lost preliminary
Pickering Panthers defeated Oshawa Legionaires 4 games to 2
1998 – lost semi-final
Oshawa Legionaires defeated Shelburne Wolves 3 games to none
Oshawa Legionaires defeated Wellington Dukes 3 games to 2
Wexford Raiders defeated Oshawa Legionaires 4 games to 2

Notable alumni
Notable alumni of the Legionnaires, and the Fury include:

Sean Brown
Jeff Daniels
Dale Hawerchuk
John MacLean
Rob Pearson
Peter Sidorkiewicz
Chris Tanev
Jason Ward

References

External links
Whitby Fury

Ontario Provincial Junior A Hockey League teams
Sport in Whitby, Ontario
2008 establishments in Ontario
Ice hockey clubs established in 2008